Cukic, Čukić, or Cukić, may refer to:

 Dejan Čukić (born 1966, Berane, Montenegro), Montenegrin-Danish actor
 Vladan Čukić (born 1980), Serbian footballer
 Bojan Čukić (born 1988, Belgrade), Serbian footballer
 Dejan Cukić (born 1959), Serbian rock musician, journalist and writer

Serbian surnames
Montenegrin surnames

sr:Цукићи